Mustafa Güven Karahan (1943 – 2 September 2013) was a Turkish politician. He served as the Minister of Health 1999.

Karahan graduated from Istanbul University's Cerrahpaşa Medical Faculty. He completed his thesis at Hacettepe University's Faculty of Medicine. He worked as the Urology department of the Bandırma State Hospital. He served as the deputy of Balıkesir in the 20th and 21st terms. Karahan was married and had two children.

References 

1943 births
2013 deaths
Democratic Left Party (Turkey) politicians
Istanbul University Cerrahpaşa Faculty of Medicine alumni
Health ministers of Turkey
People from Kastamonu
Members of the 20th Parliament of Turkey
Members of the 21st Parliament of Turkey
Members of the 56th government of Turkey